The Art Scanlan House is a historic house on Record Loop (County Road 1), just west of United States Route 65 in Bee Branch, Arkansas.  It is a single-story wood-frame structure, with a gable-on-hip roof, weatherboard siding, and a foundation of concrete and fieldstone.  It has modest Folk Victorian styling, with gingerbread cutouts in the gables, and a turned-spindle balustrade on the front porch.  The house was built about 1907, and shares characteristics with the Collums-Baker House, suggesting both may have the same builder.

The house was listed on the National Register of Historic Places in 1999.

See also
National Register of Historic Places listings in Van Buren County, Arkansas

References

Houses on the National Register of Historic Places in Arkansas
Houses completed in 1906
National Register of Historic Places in Van Buren County, Arkansas
1906 establishments in Arkansas
Folk Victorian architecture in the United States
Victorian architecture in Arkansas
Houses in Van Buren County, Arkansas